These are the official results of the Women's Shot Put event at the 2003 World Championships in Paris, France. There were a total number of 25 participating athletes, with the final held on Wednesday 27 August 2003. The qualification mark was set at 18.40 metres.

Medalists

Schedule
All times are Central European Time (UTC+1)

Abbreviations
All results shown are in metres

Records

Qualification

Group A

Group B

Final

See also
 2003 Shot Put Year Ranking
Athletics at the 2003 Pan American Games - Women's shot put

References
 Results(  2009-05-14)
 todor66

J
Shot put at the World Athletics Championships
2003 in women's athletics